David Gerald Hessayon OBE (born 1928) is a British author and botanist of Cypriot descent who is known for a best-selling series of paperback gardening manuals known as the "Expert Guides" under his title Dr. D. G. Hessayon. The series started in 1958 with Be Your Own Gardening Expert and in 2008 it celebrated its 50th anniversary and the 50 millionth copy in print. They have become the best selling gardening books in history.

Early life
Hessayon is the son of a Cypriot landowner and grew up in Salford, Lancashire, England. He gained a Bachelor of Science degree in botany from Leeds University. In 1950, he travelled to the United States where he worked as the editor of a small town newspaper. In 1953, he went to the Gold Coast as a Research Fellow at the University College before returning to Manchester to obtain his doctorate in soil ecology. In 1955, he accepted a position as chief scientist with Pan Britannica Industries Ltd (PBI), becoming chairman in 1972. It was whilst working for PBI that Dr. Hessayon formulated the idea for his "Expert" guides to gardening.

The "Expert" guides
A steady stream of publications followed the initial Be Your Own Gardening Expert, each maintaining the basic formula of down-to-earth writing broken up into short sections with headers, and illustrated with what were at the time lavish numbers of colour photographs, graphic images and charts. In later editions the Be Your Own ...Expert titles were changed to The ... Expert. On the British bestsellers list for the 1980s, two Experts were in the Top 10. The Vegetable & Herb Expert  continues to be the best seller.

Recognition
In 1993, Hessayon received the first-ever Lifetime Achievement award at the British Book Awards. He was also awarded the Veitch Memorial Medal of the Royal Horticultural Society in 1992 for his contribution to the advancement and improvement of the science and practice of horticulture. In 1999, he was awarded a Guinness World Records certificate for being Britain's "bestselling non-fiction author of the 1990s".

Despite a resolve to stay out of the limelight, Hessayon has received further awards - a Lifetime Achievement Award from the Garden Media Guild, three honorary doctorates  and, in 2007, an OBE.

Bibliography
Since 1959, Hessayon has written many books.

Notes

1928 births
Living people
English gardeners
Veitch Memorial Medal recipients
English people of Cypriot descent
Officers of the Order of the British Empire
British garden writers
Gardens in the United Kingdom
Alumni of the University of Leeds
British expatriates in the United States
British expatriates in Ghana